Outrun The Sky is the fourth album from American R&B singer, Lalah Hathaway. The album was released on September 7, 2004.

Background
In 2003, Lalah Hathaway appeared with Sanctuary, Pyramid, Mesa, and Blue Moon Records. In 2004, Hathaway released a cover version of Luther Vandross's song "Forever, For Always, For Love". The song later appeared on the all-star tribute album "Forever, For Always, For Luther". The album features production from Rex Rideout, Mike City, and Chris Parks. Outrun The Sky was also released as an Enhanced CD.

Music
With the roster of 13 tracks, Allmusic.com chose the album picks to be "Forever, For Always, For Love", "Back Then", and "Boston".  The songs of album use the instruments of a keyboard, organ, guitars, drums, bass, and trumpet, which were demonstrated on the songs "Better and Better", "Stronger", "If U Ever", and "How Many Times". Allmusic also went on to the describe the album's mood as Warm, Reflective, Passionate, Smooth, Lush, Romantic, Calm/Peaceful, Intimate, Soothing, and Sensual.

The track, "Better And Better" began as a track intended for an Eric Benet album of the same name.  His finished track is the same as the one used on this album.  Eric Benet's lead and backgrounds were simply removed and Lalah's were added.

Promotion
Following the album's two singles, Hathaway went on the Daughters of Soul tour. Hathaway toured along with Sandra St. Victor, Nona Hendryx, Indira Khan (daughter of Chaka Khan), Simone (daughter of Nina Simone), and Joyce Kennedy of Mother's Finest.

Singles
Forever, For Always, For Love was released the lead single and peaked #1 on the Adult R&B charts. Forever, For Always, For Love became Hathaway's first single to chart on the Billboard's Hot 100, charting at #112 and #37 on the Hot R&B charts.
Better and Better was released as the album's second single. The song received no promotion and no music video. The result left the song to debut at #121 on the Hot R&B charts.

Reviews

The album received a review from David Jeffries of AllMusic. David Jeffries responded, "Few mainstream artists can keep the lazy release schedule Don Hathaway's daughter does and retain a strong fan base. It's been a whole decade since Lalah Hathaway released one of her own albums and half that long since she joined Joe Sample for The Song Lives On. It's her warm voice, smooth delivery, and allegiance to fad-free R&B that keeps the faithful patiently waiting. Delivering on all counts, Outrun the Sky is a fan's dream and the singer's best showcase since her debut. While The Song Lives On was more ambitious and in turn brought more fans, Outrun the Sky is a better showcase. Not only does Hathaway cover a wider spectrum of tones and moods but she also producers and writes most of the highlights of the album. Her stream-of-consciousness lyrics for the title track give a more personal picture of the artist and paint her as an approachable dreamer who's as unsure as anyone. Hathaway's inspired writing is responsible for many of the other warm and reflective winners but it's the closing "Boston" that best illustrates how this husky voiced siren can conjure up a cosmopolitan song and deliver it with heart. Including her smoky take on Luther Vandross' "Forever, for Always, for Love" from the Forever, for Always, for Luther tribute is the icing on this cool cake. The ballad-heavy album still has its fair share of grooves that are rooted in R&B but the overall easy temperament isn't going to alienate any of Hathaway's smooth jazz converts. Nice to have her back; here's to a shorter wait next time."

David Nathan of Soulmusic.com also reviewed the album. "Fortunately, the year 2004 brought about a change: the release of father Donny’s “These Songs For You, Live” (which I had the honor of producing along with my good friend A. Scott Galloway) was an omen of things to come. Some months later came “Outrun The Sky” and says Lalah, “I’ve been trying to make a record for ten years and no matter how many people buy it, it’s already a success for me. I recorded it for the people who love my music and who love my Daddy so whatever happens now, it’s all a bonus. You see, I’ve been blessed to be able to play with people like the late Grover Washington Jr. and Joe Sample even without having a record out there myself. That’s what kept me going as a musician, reminding me of what I’m supposed to be doing out here. And I’ve always been very blessed: my peers have always been very complimentary so it’s never been a question for me and I know music is my life’s purpose. It’s in my blood.”

Lalah took an active hand in the creative process with “Outrun The Sky”, writing or co-writing nine songs on the album and producing or co-producing six of them. Others contributing to the project included Mike City, Chris Parks & Vivian Sessoms, Rex Rideout & Bud Harner and David Delhomme (who co-produced four tracks with Lalah). Standouts include the bluesy “We Were 2,” the gentle-yet-melancholy “Boston,” “Better And Better,” “More” and the title track. Commenting on a couple of the cuts, Lalah notes, “The song “Boston” was written back in 1993 after I moved to Los Angeles. It's the most personal song on the album: the lyrics definitely come from the heart. I was sitting in my apartment in the [San Fernando] Valley and the temperature was 104 degrees and I was miserable. I was homesick, missing all my friends and musicians in Boston. I just sat there and the whole song came out. Then, the title track is really ‘me’ – it's got that ‘space-cadet’-like flavor to it. It's esoteric, slightly ‘flower-child’-like. It has a bluesy flavor and I think people like it because it reminds them of my father's music.”

The song “Better And Better” was, according to Lalah, “originally written for Eric Benet. I harassed [the producer] Mike City for years for the song because I always loved it.” The album, Lalah says, “is really about my life over the last decade and while there isn’t really a theme, it’s about the spoils and victories of growing up and coming out the other side.”

With the release of ”Outrun The Sky,” Lalah is busy promoting the album and performing but she's quick to note that ‘live’ shows have been a key part of her activities for the last few years. “Promoters and folks in the industry would give you a lot of b.s. and have you believe you can’t have a career without a record but I’ve been playing a lot during the last two years and selling out almost everywhere we’ve been. It did surprise me but I’ve learned you can do alright even without having records out [every year].” Inevitably, when Lalah performs there are some songs that are mandatory pieces in her repertoire, mostly notably her own “I’m Coming Back” and the song “When Your Life Was Low” from her album with Joe Sample. “That’s become something of a signature tune for me,” says Lalah. “I remember when Joe and I were talking about doing the record and he said that he had been trying to get people to record it ever since Randy Crawford first did it. It’s a great piece of music but it’s a tough song. After we recorded it, I told him that no one else took it because it was mine, it was meant for me! Now I can’t go anywhere without singing it.”

The response to her latest album is such that Lalah considers the wait between albums to have been worth it: “I’m so happy about the reaction, it’s a real validation” and it comes towards the end of a year that has included a number of highpoints including her participation in the “Daughters Of Soul” European tour which was created by Sandra St. Victor and involved Lalah, Simone (daughter of Nina Simone), Milini Khan (Chaka's daughter), Nona Hendryx and Joyce Kennedy. ”It was awesome, truly inspiring and wonderful to be with all those women. The U.S. market can be hard sometimes and I’m hoping we can bring the show to U.S. audiences. Watching each of them from the wings was like being in a big master class!”

Certainly, watching Lalah Hathaway perform is also like being in such a class: all the training she received at the prestigious Berklee School Of Music along with what she inherited from her father has made her a rare artist, one who combines musicianship and a natural instinct for what works with lyrical interpretation. While she is aware of her musical gift and her ability to move people with her work, Lalah sums up where she's at by simply saying, “I feel lucky and blessed and that I’m in the right space with my music and my life.” That sense of self-assurance is evident every time she hits the stage and on her latest album. If you want some real music and you haven't yet done so, we strongly recommend you purchase a copy of ”Outrun The Sky”: it's an affirmation that we still have some true artists out here making music for the heart and soul!"

Track listing
 "How Many Times" (Mike City Flowers) — 3:39
 "Back Then" (Lalah Hathaway, Chris Parks, Vivian Sessoms) — 4:49
 "Your Favorite Song" (City Flowers) — 4:07
 "Forever, For Always, For Love" (Luther Vandross) — 5:52
 "Better and Better" (City Flowers) — 4:04
 "Outrun the Sky" (Hathaway) — 3:06
 "If U Ever" (David Delhomme, Lalah Hathaway) — 4:15
 "In the End" (Parks, Sessoms) — 3:48
 "Admit It" (Lalah Hathaway, Wondress Hutchinson, Chris Parks, Vivian Sessoms) — 5:34
 "Stronger" (Delhomme, Hathaway) — 5:47
 "We Were 2" (Delhomme, Hathaway) — 8:10
 "More" (Delhomme, Hathaway) — 5:10
 "Boston" (Hathaway) — 5:37

References

2004 albums
Lalah Hathaway albums